Andrew Fletcher (born 29 March 1993) is a New Zealand cricketer. He made his first-class debut for Wellington in the 2018–19 Plunket Shield season on 10 October 2018.

He made his List A debut for Wellington in the 2018–19 Ford Trophy on 24 October 2018, scoring 132 runs not out. One week later, in his third List A match, he scored his second century for Wellington, with 125 runs from 150 balls. He finished the tournament as the leading run-scorer, with 618 runs in twelve matches.

In June 2020, he was offered a contract by Wellington ahead of the 2020–21 domestic cricket season.

References

External links
 

1993 births
Living people
New Zealand cricketers
Wellington cricketers
Place of birth missing (living people)